The 2006–07 season was Ergotelis' 77th season in existence, first season in the Super League following the club's promotion as champions of last year's Beta Ethniki, and second season overall in the competition. Ergotelis also participated in the Greek Cup, entering the competition in the Fourth Round. The club managed to achieve its pre-season goal to stay clear of relegation, finishing 9th overall and thus secured its participation in next year's edition of the top football competition in Greece. Furthermore, Ergotelis advanced to the Greek Cup round of 16 (fifth round) for the second consecutive time before being eliminated by Greek giants PAOK.

Players

The following players have departed in mid-season 

Note: Flags indicate national team as has been defined under FIFA eligibility rules. Players and Managers may hold more than one non-FIFA nationality.

Transfers

In

Promoted from youth system

Total spending:  0,000 €

Out
 
Total income:  50,000 €
Expenditure:  50,000 €

Kit
2006−07

|
|
|

Pre-season and friendlies

Pre-season friendlies

Mid-season friendlies

Competitions

Overview

Super League

League table

Results summary

Matches

Greek Cup

Matches

Statistics

Goal scorers

Last updated: 25 April 2014

References

Ergotelis
Ergotelis F.C. seasons